This article lists political parties in Somalia. In 2017 an independent electoral commission was inaugurated with a mandate to oversee the process of registration of political parties in the country, according to Article 47 of the Federal Provisional Constitution which provides for an electoral system. The system guarantees participation of every individual who subscribes to a political party. NIEC has registered over 100 political parties, most of which still operate from outside the country for security reasons.

In October 2019 six parties joined together to form the Forum for National Parties, an alliance founded by former president Sharif Sheikh Ahmed which has come together to address the political and security issues faced by Somalia. The alliance includes Himilo Qaran party, led by former President Sharif Sheikh Ahmed, and Peace and Development Party led by former President Hassan Sheikh Mohamud. Other key leaders joining the coalition include Ilays party leader Abdulkadir Osoble, former South West President Sharif Hassan and former defense minister Mohamed Abdi, the first interim president of Azania.

Overview and background
During the civilian administration which existed prior to the seizure of power by the Supreme Revolutionary Council (SRC) in 1969, there were a number of local political parties. Most notable of these early institutions was the Somali Youth League, the nation's first political organization. Upon assuming office, the SRC (led by Siad Barre) outlawed all extant political parties, and established the Somali Revolutionary Socialist Party to advocate a form of scientific socialism inspired by Maoist China and the Soviet Union. Following the outbreak of the civil war in 1991 that saw the ouster of the Barre regime, many of the few remaining political parties gave way to autonomous or semi-autonomous regional states, or fragmented into feuding militia groups. After several unsuccessful national reconciliation efforts, a Transitional Federal Government (TFG) was formed in 2000 with a five-year mandate leading toward the establishment of a new constitution and a transition to a representative government. The Federal Government of Somalia was established on August 20, 2012, concurrent with the end of the TFG's interim mandate. It represents the first permanent central government in the country since the start of the civil war.

On 29 May 2017, the Somali Political Parties Registration Office was established in Mogadishu. The office's job is to bring the country to the party system and remove it from the current 4.5 clan power-sharing system. On 3 December 2017, the Independent Electoral Commission began registering political parties in Somalia for the first time in 50 years.

Parties

Current 
As of 2020, the National Independent Electoral Commission (NIEC) has registered a total of 106 parties.

Former

Puntland
As of May 2020, there are 17 registered political parties in Puntland.

Somaliland (disputed entity)

See also 
Politics of Somalia
Lists of political parties

References 

Somalia
 
Political parties
Political parties
Somalia